The 2010 Estoril Open was a tennis tournament played on outdoor clay courts. It was the 21st edition of the Estoril Open for the men (the 14th for the women), and was part of the ATP World Tour 250 series of the 2010 ATP World Tour, and of the International-level tournaments of the 2010 WTA Tour. Both the men's and the women's events took place at the Estádio Nacional in Oeiras, Portugal, from 3 May until 9 May 2010. Albert Montañés and Anastasija Sevastova won the singles title.

ATP entrants

Seeds

 Seedings are based on the rankings of April 26, 2010.

Other entrants
The following players received wildcards into the main draw:
  Rui Machado
  Gaël Monfils
  Leonardo Tavares

The following players received entry from the qualifying draw:
  Pablo Andújar
  Federico Delbonis
  Marc López
  Alberto Martín

The following players received the lucky loser spot:
  David Marrero
  Michał Przysiężny

Withdrawals
The following notable players withdrew from the event:
  Ivan Ljubičić (left side strain)
  Gaël Monfils (stomach)

WTA entrants

Seeds

 Seedings are based on the rankings of April 26, 2010.

Other entrants
The following players received wildcards into the main draw:
  Magali de Lattre
  Maria João Koehler
  Michelle Larcher de Brito

The following players received entry from the qualifying draw:
  Nina Bratchikova
  Dia Evtimova
  Yvonne Meusburger
  Arantxa Rus

The following player received the lucky loser spot:
  Jarmila Groth

Finals

Men's singles

 Albert Montañés defeated  Frederico Gil, 6–2, 6–7(4–7), 7–5
It was Montanes' first title of the year and 4th of his career. He defended his title.

Women's singles

 Anastasija Sevastova defeated  Arantxa Parra Santonja, 6–2, 7–5
 It was Sevastova's first career title.

Men's doubles

 Marc López /  David Marrero defeated  Pablo Cuevas /  Marcel Granollers, 6–7(1–7), 6–4, [10–4]

Women's doubles

 Sorana Cîrstea /  Anabel Medina Garrigues defeated  Vitalia Diatchenko /  Aurélie Védy, 6–1, 7–5

External links
 Official website

Portugal Open
Estoril
Estoril
Estoril Open
May 2010 sports events in Europe
 Estoril Open